Filter, filtering or filters may refer to:

Science and technology

Computing
 Filter (higher-order function), in functional programming
 Filter (software), a computer program to process a data stream
 Filter (video), a software component that performs some operation on a multimedia stream
 Email filtering, the processing of email to organize it according to specified criteria
 Content-control software also known as an Internet filter
 Wordfilter, a script typically used on Internet forums or chat rooms
 Berkeley Packet Filter, filter expression used in the qualification of network data
 DSL filter, a low-pass filter installed between analog devices and a telephone line
 Helicon Filter, a raster graphics editor
 Filter (large eddy simulation), a mathematical operation intended to remove a range of small scales from the solution to the Navier-Stokes equations
 Kalman filter, an approximating algorithm in optimal control applications and problems

Device 
 Filter (chemistry), a device which separates solids from fluids (liquids or gases) by adding a medium through which only the fluid can pass
 Filter (aquarium), critical components of both freshwater and marine aquaria
 Filter paper, a semi-permeable paper barrier placed perpendicular to a liquid or air flow. It is used to separate fine solids from liquids or air
 Air filter, a device composed of fibrous materials which removes solid particulates such as dust, pollen, mold, and bacteria from the air
 Oil filter, a filter to remove contaminants from engine oil, transmission oil, lubricating oil, or hydraulic oil
 Pneumatic filter, a device which removes contaminants from a compressed air stream
 Water filter, removes impurities from water by means of a fine physical barrier, a chemical process or a biological process
 Cigarette filter, a part of a cigarette intended to filter the smoke inhaled by a smoker
 Coffee filter, a utensil used to separate coffee grounds from liquid coffee
 Fuel filter, found in most internal combustion engines
 Filtration (wine)
 Sieve or macroscopic filter, a device for separating wanted elements from unwanted material

Mathematics 
 Filter (mathematics), a special subset of a partially ordered set.
 Filter (set theory), a special family of subsets that forms an (order theoretic) filter with respect to set inclusion
 Filters in topology, the use of collections of subsets to describe convergence.
 Filtering problem (stochastic processes), a mathematical model for a number of filtering problems in signal processing and the like.
 Filtration (mathematics), an indexed set of subobjects of a given algebraic structure S.

Optics 
 Optical filter, selectively transmits light of different wavelengths
 Interference filter, reflects one or more spectral bands or lines and transmits others, while maintaining a nearly zero coefficient of absorption for all wavelengths of interest
 Dichroic filter, a very accurate color filter used to selectively pass light of a small range of colors while reflecting other colors
 Hydrogen-alpha filter, an optical filter that transmits a narrow bandwidth of light centred on the H-alpha wavelength
 Photographic filter, a camera accessory consisting of an optical filter that can be inserted in the optical path
 Infrared cut-off filter, designed to reflect or block mid-infrared wavelengths while passing visible light
 Chelsea filter, a dichromatic optical filter used for identifying coloured stones
 Astronomical filter, a telescope accessory used to enhance the details of celestial objects

Signal processing
 Filter (signal processing)
 Electronic filter, an electronic circuit which processes signals, for example to remove unwanted frequency components
 Digital filter, a system that performs mathematical operations to reduce or enhance certain aspects of a signal
 Analogue filter, a basic building block of signal processing much used in electronics
 Filters used in digital image processing

Arts and entertainment
 Filter (TV series), a show on the G4 channel
 Filter (magazine), an off-beat indie music magazine
 Filter Theatre, a British theatre company
 The Filter, a digital content services company based in England
 Filter (band), an American rock band
 "Filter", a song from the album Bend by 8stops7
 "Filter", a song from the album Map of the Soul: 7 by BTS

Social media 
 Filter (social media), an appearance-altering digital image effect for social media
 Beauty filter, a social media effect specifically meant to increase physical attractiveness

Other uses
 Category-based filtering of perception, according to (objectivist interpretations of) Kant
 Affective filter, an impediment to learning or acquisition caused by negative emotional ("affective") responses to one's environment
 Lane splitting, a practice that cyclists use to pass slow or stopped congested traffic
The ability of a person to self-censor themselves (their thoughts) whilst speaking
The process of real estate values lowering in price over time.

See also
 Filter coffee, a method for preparing coffee
 Filter feeder, an animal that strains food particles from water
 Lifter (signal processing)
 Philtre (disambiguation)
 Separation process
 Ultrafilter